Sugar Rush was A-Teens' third single from their second album Teen Spirit.

The song was released on radio in April 2001 and the video in May 2001 but failed to get the public's attention around Europe. However, the song was a hit in Latin America and Asia, and the video was often played in North America.

The single release had a B-side, "Give it Up" that was later included on the album's re-issue.

"Sugar Rush" peaked at number 15 in Sweden and number 72 in Germany becoming (at that time) the lowest chart positions for the A-Teens in both countries. Mexican radio embraced the track and it reached number-two on its fifth week in the Top 100, while in Argentina the band scored another Top 20 when it climbed to number 11.

Several remixes of the song were added to dance compilations in Europe, Asia and Latin America.

American boy band Dream Street also recorded the song and released it on their eponymous debut album as a third single in select regions.

Music video
The video was filmed in Malibu, California, United States while the band was there promoting the album and touring with Aaron Carter. The video was directed by Patrick Kiely  (who directed "Upside Down" and "Dancing Queen").

Releases
European 2-Track CD Single
Sugar Rush (Fredrik Thomander) [Radio Version] - 3:02
Give It Up (Anders Wikström, Fredrik Thomander) - 3:41
Video: Halfway Around The World (Gustav Jonsson, Marcus Sepehrmanesh, Tommy Tysper)

European CD Maxi
Sugar Rush [Radio Version] - 3:02
Sugar Rush [Earhbound's Short Sugarcrush Remix] - 3:20
Sugar Rush [Earhbound's Long Sugarcrush Remix] - 5:07
Sugar Rush [M12 Remix] - 6:05

Charts

Weekly charts

Year-end charts

Release history

References

A-Teens songs
2001 singles
Pop ballads
Songs written by Anders Wikström (songwriter)
Songs written by Fredrik Thomander
2001 songs
Universal Music Group singles